WVNH (91.1 FM) is a radio station broadcasting a Christian radio format. Licensed to Concord, New Hampshire, United States, the station serves the Concord and Franklin areas. The station is currently owned by New Hampshire Gospel Radio, Inc. Programming is simulcast on WANH (88.3 FM) in Meredith, serving the Lakes Region.

The licensee for WVNH and WANH is New Hampshire Gospel Radio, Inc. The board of directors are; John Loker; George Dykstra, Treasurer; Peter J. Stohrer, Technical Director; Marcy Alves; Gail Holder; John Donovan, President; Judy Mason, Vice President; Janice Cyr, Secretary/Station Manager/Director; Tom Marsh, Certified Public Accountant; and Roy McCandless, Attorney at Law.

The studios for New Hampshire Gospel Radio (NHGR) are located at 37 Redington Rd. in Concord.

Translators
In addition to the main station, WVNH is relayed by several broadcast translators to widen its broadcast area.

History
The station was assigned call sign WQFB on November 15, 1991.  On November 1, 1992, the station changed its call sign to WVNH. It took to the air on March 7, 1999; on July 1, 2009, WANH began broadcasting.

References

External links

Radio stations established in 1999
Concord, New Hampshire
Moody Radio affiliate stations
1999 establishments in New Hampshire
VNH